Lilli Pearl Friis-Hansen (born 27 January 2000) is a Danish ice hockey player and member of the Danish national ice hockey team, currently playing with the RPI Engineers women's ice hockey program in the ECAC Hockey conference of the NCAA Division I.

Friis-Hansen represented Denmark in the Division I Group A tournaments of the IIHF Women's World Championship in 2017, 2018 and 2019, and at the Top Division tournament in 2021. As a junior player with the Danish national under-18 team, she participated in the Division I Qualification tournament of the IIHF Women's U18 World Championship in 2015, the Division I tournament in 2016, and the Division I Group B tournaments in 2017 and 2018. She was named best forward of the 2017 tournament by the directorate and, in 2018, she served as team captain and led the tournament with a +12 plus–minus.

References

External links 
 

Living people
2000 births
People from Kongens Lyngby
Danish women's ice hockey forwards
RPI Engineers women's ice hockey players
Danish expatriate ice hockey people
Danish expatriate sportspeople in the United States
Expatriate ice hockey players in the United States
Ice hockey players at the 2022 Winter Olympics
Olympic ice hockey players of Denmark
Sportspeople from the Capital Region of Denmark